The non-marine molluscs of the country of Turkey are a part of the molluscan fauna of Turkey. The biodiversity of non-marine molluscs of Turkey is richer than in surrounding European states.

There are at least 825 species of non-marine molluscs living in the wild in Turkey. An approximate guess to the total number, however, is of about 1030 non-marine molluscs in Turkey (see the table below).

There are a total of 825 species of gastropods, which breaks down to 95 (counted 80 "Prosobranchia" only and at least 15 other freshwater snails from this list) taxa of freshwater gastropods (including brackish water species), and 730 species (and subspecies) of land gastropods. There is also relevant number of freshwater bivalves living in the wild in Turkey.

According to Gümüş et al. (2009), the Turkish malacofauna of land gastropods currently comprises 730 valid species and subspecies of terrestrial snails, belonging to 36 families.

Gümüş et al. (2009) stated that Turkey has a very rich freshwater malacofauna with a very large proportion of endemic species. Those authors estimated that Turkey is inhabited by at least 300 species of freshwater molluscs.

There are also significant numbers of non-indigenous species, including bivalves and various synanthropic gastropods and bivalves.

Land gastropods overview 

A country such as Turkey, with a highly variable relief and a diversified climate and vegetation, can support a similarly rich and diversified malacofauna of terrestrial gastropods. Consequently, the recent changes in both land use and climate (which is gradually shifting from semi-arid and winter-cold Central Turkey to a subtropical periphery with high humidity during winter) have immediately affected the malacofauna, causing area shifts following the unstable environmental conditions, including depletion or even complete loss of some populations. Increasing pasture farming leads to a loss of forest vegetation, and thus to a loss of those molluscan species which are adapted to such conditions.

The recent rise of average summer temperature resulting from global warming may particularly affect the Mediterranean species. Gümüş et al. (2009) speculated that both the average length of the dry summer period and the absolute temperature are rising, and that the aestivation period of species adapted to the Mediterranean drought is now too long. The animals die from starvation or desiccation, and several species or subspecies may already be approaching the verge of extinction.

As far as nomenclature, an average of two to three additional synonym names for each taxon are available to land gastropods in Turkey.

The degree of endemism for the area of Turkey is about 65%. The degree of endemism on the species level is relatively high and is comparable to that of Greece, which houses the highest number of terrestrial snail taxa in Europe, with a similarly high value of endemism. In Turkey, several pulmonate families reach a maximum of biodiversity. The biodiversity has been able to develop there without any major interruptions since the Pliocene.

The malacofauna of some areas, such as the inner Anatolian steppe areas, and many of the densely forested mountain ranges, is incompletely ascertained or almost completely unknown. As research progresses, records of species new to science can be expected, and the knowledge of the ranges of already-known taxa will increase. Another accretion in taxa numbers may be caused by the resolution of cryptic species clusters with the help of DNA sequencing methods, the Barcoding Project, and other related activities.

History of malacozoology of terrestrial gastropods 
The first species from the Turkish terrestrial malacofauna were described by Guillaume-Antoine Olivier (1756–1814), who, amongst others, collected natural history objects in the Middle East. For example he named the following species: Multidentula ovularis (Olivier, 1801) and Bulgarica denticulata (Olivier, 1801) from "Ghemlek" (= Gemlik in the Bay of Mudanya) or Assyriella guttata (Olivier, 1804) from Urfa. After Olivier, the area was visited by the German Johannes Rudolf Roth and his party, and then was target of other scientists, naturalists and collectors like Bellardi, Boissier, Dubois de Montpereux, Frivaldsky, Huet de Pavillon, Parreyss, Schläfli, Sievers and others. Their collections went to the most prolific malacologists interested in the area like Jules René Bourguignat, Jean de Charpentier, Heinrich Carl Küster, Johann Rudolf Albert Mousson, Ludwig Karl Georg Pfeiffer and Emil Adolf Rossmässler. In the second half of the 19th century, the famous German malacologists Oskar Boettger and Wilhelm Kobelt from the Senckenberg Museum in Frankfurt intensified the malacological research in Turkey, with contributions by Gottfried Nägele, Otto von Retowski and Carl Agardh Westerlund. After Kobelt’s death in 1916, the "Golden Age" of malacology was finished except for some contributions by Paul Hesse, Wassili Adolfovitch Lindholm and Otto W. von Rosen. After almost 50 years of scientific silence, it was the "Netherlands biological expedition to Turkey 1959", which again shifted the focus of malacologists to Turkey. Since then, the malacological science received an enormous boost and stimulated both international as well as Turkish scientists to deepen the knowledge of the Turkish malacofauna. During this period, which now lasts about 50 years, one third of the number of taxa accepted today as valid has been added! Some of the most active contributors to this success should be mentioned here (in alphabetic order of the surnames): R. A. Bank; G. Falkner; L. Forcart; E. Gittenberger; Z. P. Erőss; Z. Fehér; B. A. Gümüş; B. Hausdorf; V. Hudec; H.P.M.G. Menkhorst; L. Németh; E. Neubert; H. Nordsieck; B. Páll-Gergely; W. Rähle; A. Riedel; H. Schütt; R. Şeşen; M.I. Szekeres; A. Wiktor and M. Z. Yıldırım.

Freshwater gastropods 

Neritidae

 Theodoxus fluviatilis (Linnaeus, 1758) - Theodoxus fluviatilis fluviatilis (Linnaeus, 1789), Theodoxus fluviatilis euxinus (Clessin, 1885)
 Theodoxus heldreichi (Martens, 1879) - Theodoxus heldreichi heldreichi (Martens, 1879), Theodoxus heldreichi fluvicola Schütt & Seşen, 1992
 Theodoxus anatolicus (Recluz, 1841)
 Theodoxus syriacus (Bourguignat, 1852)
 Theodoxus altenai Schütt, 1965
 Theodoxus jordani (Sowerby, 1832)
 Theodoxus cinctellus (Martens, 1874)

Viviparidae

 Viviparus mamillatus (Küster, 1852)
 Viviparus contectus (Millet, 1813)
 Viviparus viviparus costae (Mousson, 1863)

Thiaridae

 Melanoides tuberculata (O. F. Müller, 1774)

Melanopsidae
 Melanopsis praemorsa (Linnaeus, 1789) - Melanopsis praemorsa praemorsa (Linnaeus, 1789), Melanopsis praemorsa ferussaci Roth, 1839, Melanopsis praemorsa maximalis Schütt, 1974
 Melanopsis buccinoidea (Olivier, 1801)
 Melanopsis costata (Olivier, 1804) - Melanopsis costata costata (Olivier, 1804), Melanopsis costata chantrei Locard, 1921
 Melanopsis nodosa Férussac, 1823
 Esperiana esperi (A. Férussac, 1823)
 Esperiana sangarica Schütt, 1974
 Esperiana acicularis stussineri Schütt, 1974

Bithyniidae

 Bithynia tentaculata (Linnaeus, 1758)
 Bithynia leachii (Sheppard, 1823)
 Bithynia pseudemmericia Schütt, 1964
 Bithynia phialensis (Conrad, 1852)
 Bithynia badiella (Küster, 1852)
 Bithynia kayrae Odabaşı & Odabaşı, 2017
 Bithynia pentheri Sturany, 1905
 Bithynia pesici - Note: listed by Şereflişan (2009), but not listed by Yildirim (2006)
 Bithynia timmii Odabaşı & Arslan, 2015
 Bithynia yildirimi Glöer & Georgiev, 2012
 Pseudobithynia adiyamanensis Gürlek, 2017
 Pseudobithynia pentheri (Sturany, 1904)
 Pseudobithynia yildirimi (Odabaşı, Kebapçı & Akbulut, 2013)

Hydrobiidae

 Potamopyrgus antipodarum J. E. Gray, 1843 - non-indigenous
 Hydrobia ventrosa (Montagu, 1803)
 Hydrobia stagnorum (Gmelin, 1790)
 Peringia ulvae (Pennant, 1777)
 Hydrobia soosi (Wagner, 1928)
 Hydrobia anatolica Schütt, 1965
 Pseudamnicola bilgini Schütt, 1993
 Pseudamnicola cirikorum Odabaşi, Odabaşi & Acar, 2019
 Pseudamnicola geldiayana Schütt, 1970
 Pseudamnicola intranodosa Schütt, 1993
 Pseudamnicola radeae Odabaşi, Odabaşi & Acar, 2019
 Pyrgorientalia zilchi (Schütt, 1964)
 Grossuana kayrae Odabaşi, Odabaşi & Acar, 2019
 Isparta felei Yildirim, Koca, Gürlek & Glöer, 2018
 Kirelia carinata Radoman, 1973
 Kirelia murtici Radoman, 1973
 Falsipyrgula pfeiferi (Weber, 1927)
 Falsipyrgula beysehirana (Schütt, 1965)
 Falsipyrgula schuetti Yildirim, 1999
 Horatia parvula (Naegele, 1894)
 Pseudorientalia ceriti Gürlek, 2017
 Pseudorientalia natolica (Küster, 1852) - Pseudorientalia natolica natolica (Küster, 1852), Pseudorientalia natolica smyrnensis Schütt, 1970
 Falsibelgrandiella bunarica Radoman, 1973
 Tefennia tefennica Schütt & Yildirim, 2003 - Tefenni spring snail
 Orientalina caputlacus Schütt, 1993
 Turkorientalia anatolica Radoman, 1973
 Sheitanok amidicus Schütt & Şeşen, 1991
 Graecoanatolica lacustristurca Radoman, 1973
 Graecoanatolica tenuis Radoman, 1973
 Graecoanatolica kocapinarica Radoman, 1973
 Graecoanatolica conica Radoman, 1973
 Graecoanatolica brevis Radoman, 1973
 Graecoanatolica pamphylica (Schütt, 1964)
 Heleobia longiscata (Bourguignat, 1856)
 Belgrandiella edessana Schütt, 1993
 Belgrandiella cavernica Boettger, 1957
 Belgrandiella adsharica (Lindholm, 1913)
 Sadleriana affinis (Frauenfeld, 1863)
 Sadleriana byzanthina (Küster, 1852) - Sadleriana byzanthina byzanthina (Küster, 1852), Sadleriana byzanthina demirsoyii Yildirim & Morkoyunlu, 1997
 Sadleriana fluminensis (Küster, 1852)
 Sadleriana minuta (Naegele, 1903)
 Islamia pseudorientalica Radoman, 1973
 Islamia anatolica Radoman, 1973
 Islamia bunarbasa (Schütt, 1964)

Lithoglyphidae
 Lithoglyphus naticoides (C. Pfeiffer, 1828)

Bythinellidae
 Bythinella anatolica Yıldırım, Kebapçı & Bahadır Koca 2015
 Bythinella gokceadaensis Odabaşi, Odabaşi & Acar, 2019
 Bythinella istanbulensis Yıldırım, Kebapçı & Yüce 2015
 Bythinella kazdaghensis Odabaşı & Georgiev, 2014
 Bythinella magdalenae Yıldırım, Kebapçı & Bahadır Koca 2015
 Bythinella occasiuncula Boeters & Falkner, 2001
 Bythinella opaca Gallenstein, 1848
 Bythinella turca Radoman, 1976
 Bythinella wilkei Yıldırım, Kebapçı & Bahadır Koca 2015
 Bythinella yerlii Gürlek, 2017
 Bythinella sp. A - an unidentified species from Istanbul sensu Yildirim (2006)

Assimineidae
 Paludinella littorina (delle Chiaje, 1828)

Valvatidae
 Valvata cristata O. F. Müller, 1774
 Valvata saulcyi Bourguignat, 1853
 Valvata macrostoma (Mörch, 1864)
 Valvata piscinalis (O. F. Müller, 1774)
 Borysthenia naticina (Menke, 1845)

(All species above this line are freshwater "Prosobranchia".)

Cochliopidae
 Heleobia contempta (Dautzenberg, 1894) / Semisalsa contempta (Dautzenberg, 1894)
 Heleobia longiscata (Bourguignat, 1856) / Semisalsa longiscata (Bourguignat, 1856)

Physidae
 Physella acuta (Draparnaud, 1805)

Planorbidae
 Anisus leucostoma (Millet, 1813)
 Anisus spirorbis (Linnaeus, 1758)
 Anisus vortex (Linnaeus, 1758)
 Anisus vorticulus (Troschel, 1834)
 Gyraulus albus (O. F. Müller, 1774)
 Gyraulus euphraticus (Mousson, 1874)
 Gyraulus laevis (Alder, 1838)
 Gyraulus pamphylicus Glöer & Rähle, 2007
 Gyraulus parvus (Say, 1817)
 Gyraulus piscinarum (Bourguignat, 1852)
 Planorbis planorbis (Linnaeus, 1758)

Lymnaeidae
 Galba truncatula (O. F. Müller, 1774)
 Lymnaea stagnalis (Linnaeus, 1758)
 Radix auricularia (Linnaeus, 1758)
 Radix peregra (O. F. Müller, 1774) - synonym: Radix labiata (Rossmässler, 1835)

Ellobiidae
 Myosotella myosotis (Draparmaud, 1801) - semi-marine

Land gastropods 

Ellobiidae
 Leucophytia bidentata (Montagu, 1808) - semi-marine species

Truncatellidae
 Truncatella subcylindrica (Linnaeus, 1767)

Succineidae
 Oxyloma elegans (Risso, 1826)

Pyramidulidae
 Pyramidula cephalonica (Westerlund, 1898)
 Pyramidula chorismenostoma (Westerlund & Blanc, 1879)
 Pyramidula pusilla (Vallot, 1801)

Clausiliidae
 175 species of Clausiliidae in Turkey. Turkey is home to 95% of the subfamily Mentissoideinae.
 Albinaria caerulea maculata (Rossmässler, 1836)
 Albinaria discolor (Pfeiffer, 1846)
 Albinaria latelamellaris Neubert, Örstan & Welter-Schultes, 2000
 Bulgarica denticulata (Olivier, 1801)
 Bulgarica erberi (Frauenfeld, 1867)
 Cotyorica nemethi Grego & Szekeres, 2017
 Nothoserrulina subterranea Németh & Szekeres, 1995
 Papillifera bidens (Linnaeus, 1758) - synonym: Papillifera papillaris (O. F. Müller, 1774)
 Pontophaedusa funiculum (Mousson, 1856)
 Pontophaedusella ofensis Nordsieck, 1994
 Sprattia sowerbyana O. Boettger, 1883

Ferussaciidae
 Cecilioides acicula (Müller, 1774)

Achatinidae
 Rumina saharica Pallary, 1901

Pupillidae
 Pupilla triplicata (Studer, 1820)

Lauriidae
 Lauria cylindracea (Da Costa, 1778)

Orculidae
 41 species of Orculidae in Turkey
 Alvariella
 Alvariella multiplicata Hausdorf 1996
 Orcula
 Orcula zilchi Urbański, 1960
 Orculella
 Orculella bulgarica bulgarica (P. Hesse 1915)
 Orculella bulgarica lamellata Hausdorf, 1996
 Orculella critica Hausdorf, 1996
 Orculella garzanensis Schütt, 1996
 Orculella? heterostropha commagenensis (Neubert, 1988)
 Orculella? heterostropha heterostropha (O. Boettger, 1905)
 Orculella ignorata Hausdorf, 1996
 Orculella menkhorsti menkhorsti Hausdorf, 1996
 Orculella menkhorsti sinistrorsa Hausdorf, 1996
 Orculella mesopotamica mesopotamica (Mousson, 1874)
 Orculella mesopotamica riedeli Hausdorf, 1996
 Orculella orientalis (L. Pfeiffer 1861)
 Orculella? palatalis (Pilsbry 1922)
 Orculella pfeiferi Hausdorf 1996
 Orculella ruderalis urartaeica Hausdorf 1996
 Orculella sirianocoriensis libanotica (Tristram 1865)
 Pagodulina hauseri E.Gittenberger, 1978
 Pagodulina pisidica Schütt, 1993
 Pagodulina sparsa Pilsbry, 1924
 Pagodulina subdola (Gredler, 1856)
 Pilorcula Germain, 1912
 Pilorcula trifilaris anatolica Hausdorf, 1996
 Pilorcula trifilaris longior Hausdorf, 1996
 Schileykula
 Schileykula aculeata E. Gittenberger & Menkhorst, 1993
 Schileykula attilae Páll-Gergely, 2010
 Schileykula batumensis (Retowski, 1889)
 Schileykula inversa Schütt, 1993
 Schileykula nordsiecki Hausdorf, 1996
 Schileykula (?) robusta (Nägele, 1910)
 Schileykula scyphus cilicica Hausdorf, 1996
 Schileykula scyphus enteroplax (Pilsbry, 1922)
 Schileykula scyphus erecta Hausdorf, 1996
 Schileykula scyphus lycaonica Hausdorf, 1996
 Schileykula scyphus scyphus (L. Pfeiffer, 1848)
 Schileykula sigma Hausdorf, 1996
 Schileykula trapezensis acampsis Hausdorf, 1996
 Schileykula trapezensis contraria Neubert, 1993
 Schileykula trapezensis neuberti Hausdorf, 1996
 Schileykula trapezensis trapezensis (Stojaspal, 1981)
Sphyradium
 Sphyradium doliolum (Bruguière, 1792)

Chondrinidae
 Granopupa granum (Draparnaud, 1801)
 Rupestrella rhodia (Roth, 1839)

Pleurodiscidae
 Pleurodiscus balmei (Potiez & Michaud, 1838)

Truncatellinidae
 Truncatellina callicratis (Scacchi, 1833)
 Truncatellina cylindrica (A. Férussac, 1807)

Valloniidae
 Vallonia pulchella (O. F. Müller, 1774)

Enidae
 Enormous radiation of the family Enidae on the Macaronesian Islands: 115 species of Enidae in Turkey
 Chondrula lycaonica (Sturany, 1904)
 Chondrula orientalis (Pfeiffer, 1848)
 Chondrula sturmii (Küster, 1852)
 Chondrula werneri (Sturany, 1902)
 Chondrus tournefortianus (Férussac, 1821)
 Ena dazimonensis Hausdorf & Bank, 2001
 Ena frivaldskyi (L. Pfeiffer, 1847)
 Ena menkhorsti Hausdorf & Bank, 2001
 Ena nogellii (Roth, 1850) - synonym: Buliminus ponticus Retowski, 1886
 Imparietula ridvani Schütt, 1995
 Jaminia loewii (Philippi, 1844)
 Jaminia loewii godetiana (Kobelt, 1880)
 Mastus rossmaessleri (Pfeiffer, 1847)
 Meijeriella raynevaliana (Bourguignat, 1855)
 Multidentula ovularis (Olivier, 1801)
 Pseudojaminia seductilis (Rossmässler, 1837)
 Zebrina (Rhabdoena) cosensis (Reeve, 1849)

Punctidae
 Paralaoma servilis (Shuttleworth, 1852)
 Punctum pygmaeum (Draparnaud, 1801)

Arionidae
 Arion ater s.l. 

Oxychilidae
 45 species of Oxychilidae in Turkey
 Mediterranea depressa (Sterki, 1880)
 Mediterranea hydatina (Rossmässler, 1838)
 Morlina moussoni (Kobelt, 1878)
 Nastia viridula Riedel, 1989 - north-eastern Turkey
 Oxychilus cyprius (Pfeiffer, 1847)
 Oxychilus hydatinus (Rossmässler, 1838)
 Schistophallus investigatus (A. Riedel, 1993)

Pristilomatidae
 Vitrea contracta (Westerlund, 1871)
 Vitrea pygmaea (Boettger, 1880)
 Vitrea riedeli Damjanov et Pintér, 1969
 Vitrea storchi Pintér, 1978

Zonitidae
 Zonites algirus (Linnaeus, 1758)
 Zonites smyrnensis (Roth, 1839)

Trigonochlamydidae
 Drilolestes retowskii (O. Boettger, 1884)
 Selenochlamys pallida O. Boettger, 1883
 Trigonochlamys imitatrix O. Boettger, 1881

Milacidae
 Tandonia budapestensis (Hazay, 1880)

Limacidae
 Ambigolimax valentianus  (A. Ferussac, 1822)

Agriolimacidae
 Deroceras turcicum (Simroth, 1894)

Helicodontidae
 Lindholmiola lens (Férussac, 1832)

Geomitridae
 Cernuella virgata (Da Costa, 1778)
 Microxeromagna lowei (Potiez et Michaud, 1838)
 Trochoidea pyramidata (Draparnaud, 1805)
 Trochoidea trochoides (Poiret, 1789)
 Xeropicta krynickii (Krynicki, 1833)

Hygromiidae
 Turkey has 112 species of Hygromiidae and it is strong for several endemic genera of Hygromiidae.
 Harmozica occidentalis Hausdorf, 2004
 Metafruticicola dedegoelensis Hausdorf, Gümüş & Yildirim, 2004
 Metafruticicola oerstani Hausdorf, Gümüş & Yildirim, 2004
 Metafruticicola pellita (A. Férussac, 1832)
 Metafruticicola redtenbacheri (Pfeiffer, 1856)
 Monacha claustralis (Menke, 1828)
 Monacha gemina Hausdorf, 2000
 Monacha georgievi Páll-Gergely, 2010
 Monacha liebegottae (Hausdorf, 2000)
 Monacha ocellata (Roth, 1839)
 Monacha oecali Hausdorf & Páll-Gergely, 2009
 Monacha phazimonitica Hausdorf, 2000
 Monacha syriaca (Ehrenberg, 1831)
 Monacha tibarenica Neiber & Hausdorf, 2017

Helicidae
 Turkey has 52 species of the subfamily Helicinae.
 Assyriella guttata (Olivier, 1804)
 Cantareus apertus (Born, 1778)
 Cryptomphalus aspersus (Müller, 1774)
 Eobania vermiculata (Müller, 1774)
 Helicigona matrella (Westerlund, 1898)
 Helix asemnis Bourguignat, 1860
 Helix cincta Müller, 1774
 Helix figulina Rossmässler, 1839
 Helix lucorum Linnaeus, 1758
 Helix nucula Mousson, 1854
 Helix pomacella Mousson, 1854

Trissexodontidae
 Caracollina lenticula (Michaud, 1831)

Bivalves
Unionidae
 Unio stevenianus Krynicki, 1837
 Unio terminalis - Unio terminalis delicatus (Lea, 1863)

Sphaeriidae
 Pisidium subtruncatum Malm, 1855

Dreissenidae
 Dreissena polymorpha (Pallas, 1771)

See also
Lists of molluscs of surrounding countries:
 List of non-marine molluscs of Bulgaria
 List of non-marine molluscs of Greece
 List of non-marine molluscs of Georgia (country)
 List of non-marine molluscs of Armenia
 List of non-marine molluscs of Azerbaijan
 List of non-marine molluscs of Iran
 List of non-marine molluscs of Iraq
 List of non-marine molluscs of Syria
 List of non-marine molluscs of Cyprus

References
This articles incorporates CC-BY-3.0 text from reference.

Further reading 
  Bank R. A. & Menkhorst H. P. M. G. (1994). "Katalog der rezenten Clausiliidae (exkl. Gattung Albinaria) der Türkei (Gastropoda, Pulmonata)". Deinsea 1: 85–122, Rotterdam.
 Gümüş B. A. (2004). Taxonomic studies on the Clausiliidae (Gastropoda: Pulmonata) species distributed in Western Anatolia. PhD thesis, University of Süleyman Demirel, Isparta, Turkey.
 Gümüş B. A. (2005). "The land snails (Gastropoda: Pulmonata: Stylommatophora: Clausiliidae) of the ancient cities in the Marmara, the Ege (Aegean) and the Akdeniz (Mediterranean) regions of Turkey". The Archaeo+Malacology Group Newsletter 7: 1–4. http://triton.anu.edu.au/issue_7.htm
 Gümüş B. A. (2010). The land snails of Kâhta, Adıyaman, Turkey (Mollusca: Gastropoda: Pulmonata)". Munis Entomology & Zoology 5(1): 286-289. PDF.
 Hausdorf B. (2000). "The genus Monacha in Turkey (Gastropoda: Pulmonata: Hygromiidae). Archiv für Molluskenkunde 128(1/2): 61–151, Frankfurt am Main.
 Loosjes F. E. (1963). "Clausiliidae (Gastropoda, Pulmonata) collected by the Netherlands biological expedition to Turkey in 1959". Zoologische Mededelingen 38 (15): 243–260, pl. 18–20, Leiden.
 Nemeth L. & Szekeres M. (1995). "The systematic position of some new and little-known species of Clausiliidae from Turkey (Mollusca, Stylommatophora)". Zoology in the Middle East 11: 93–108, Heidelberg.
 Neubert E. (1992). "Descriptions of new taxa of the Clausiliidae from Turkey (Mollusca: Stylommatophora)". Zoology in the Middle East 7: 65–86, Heidelberg.
 Neubert E. (1995). "Note on some genera of Clausiliidae from Turkey (Mollusca, Stylommatophora)". Zoology in the Middle East 11: 101–118, Heidelberg.
 Neubert E. & Menkhorst H.P.M.G. (1994). "New taxa of Armenica (Mollusca, Stylommatophora, Clausiliidae) from Turkey". Zoology in the Middle East 10: 139–159, Heidelberg.
  Nordsieck H. (1993). "Türkische Clausiliidae, I: Neue Arttaxa des Genus Albinaria Vest, 1867 in Süd-Anatolien (Gastropoda: Stylommatophora)". Stuttgarter Beiträge zur Naturkunde, Serie A (Biologie) 499: 1–31, Stuttgart.
  Nordsieck H. (1994) "Türkische Clausiliidae, II: Neue Taxa der Unterfamilien Serrulininae und Mentissoideinae in Anatolien (Gastropoda: Stylommatophora)".  Stuttgarter Beiträge zur Naturkunde, Serie A (Biologie) 513: 1–36, Stuttgart.
  Nordsieck H. (2004) "Türkische Clausiliidae, III: Neue Arttaxa der Unterfamilien Alopiinae und Mentissoideinae aus Anatolien (Gastropoda: Stylommatophora)". Stuttgarter Beiträge zur Naturkunde, Serie A (Biologie) 670: 1–28, Stuttgart. PDF.
 Örstan A., Yıldırım M. Z., Gümüş B.A. & Welter-Schultes F. (2005). "The land snails of the Bodrum". Mitteilungen der Deutschen Malakozoologischen Gesellschaft, 73/74: 1–15, Frankfurt am Main.
  Riedel A. (1995). "Wenig bekannte und neue Zonitidae aus der Türkei (Gastropoda: Stylommatophora)". Malakologische Abhandlungen Staatliches Museum für Tierkunde Dresden 17(10): 121–136, Dresden.
  Riedel A. (1989). "Zonitidae (sensu lato) des Ostpontischen Gebirges in der Türkei (Gastropoda)". Ann. Zoologici 42: 363–424, Warszawa.
  Schütt H. (1965). "Zur Systematik und Ökologie türkischer Süßwasserprosobranchier". Zoologische Mededelingen 41(3): 43-72, Plate 1. abstract,  PDF.
  Schütt H. (1993). Turkische Landschnecken. Christa Hemmen, Wiesbaden.
 Schütt H. (2005). Turkish land snails 1758–2005. 4th, revised and enlarged edition. Verlag Natur & Wissenschaft Solingen, 559 p.
 Şeşen R. & Schütt H. (2005). "The clausilioid genus Idyla in Turkey (Gastropoda: Pulmonata: Clausiliidae)". Club Conchylia Informationen 37(1/2): 3–5, Ludwigsburg.
  Stojaspal F. (1986). "Ein Beitrag zur Molluskenfauna der Türkei". Mitteilungen der Deutschen Malakozoologischen Gesellschaft 38: 11–20, Frankfurt am Main.
   Sturany R. (1894). "Zur Molluskenfauna der europäischen Türkei.  Annalen des k. k. Naturhistorischen Hofmuseums 9: 369–394. 3 tables.
 Tillier S. P. & Mordan P. (1983). "The conchological collections of Bruguière and Olivier from the Ottoman Empire (1792–1798)". Journal of Conchology 31(3): 153–161, pl. 5–7. London.
 Uit De Weerd D. R. & Gittenberger E. (2005). "Towards a monophyletic genus Albinaria (Gastropoda, Pulmonata): the first molecular study into the phylogenetic position of eastern Albinaria species". Zoological Journal of the Linnean Society 143: 531–542, London.
 Yıldırım M. Z., Kebapçı Ü. & Gümüş B. A. (2004). "Edible Snails (Terrestrial) of Turkey. Turkish Journal of Zoology 28: 329–335, Ankara.

about bivalves
 Şereflişan H., Şereflişan M. & Soylu S. (2009). "Description of Glochidia of Three Species of Freshwater Mussels (Unionidae) from Southeastern Turkey". Malacologia 51(1): 165-172. .

External links
 Turkey and Cyprus: list of species where we do not have pictures yet

Lists of biota of Turkey

Turkey
Turkey
Turkey